The following lists events that happened during 1922 in the Union of Soviet Socialist Republics.

Incumbents 
 General Secretary of the Communist Party of the Soviet Union – Joseph Stalin (starting 3 April)
 Chairman of the Central Executive Committee of the Congress of Soviets – Mikhail Kalinin (starting 30 December)
 Chairman of the Council of People's Commissars of the Soviet Union – Vladimir Lenin (starting 30 December)

Events

February 
 5-14 February – Battle of Volochayevka

March 
 27 March – 2 April – 11th Congress of the Russian Communist Party (Bolsheviks)

December 
 30 December – The Declaration of the Creation of the USSR is ratified.

Births 
 5 January – Aleksey Gushchin, Olympic shooting champion (died 1986)
 7 March – Olga Ladyzhenskaya, mathematician
 20 March –  Irina Antonova, art historian (died 2020)
 30 March – Konstantin Kabanov, Soviet Air Force pilot and Hero of the Soviet Union
 1 December – Vsevolod Bobrov, Olympic footballer
 2 December – Ekaterina Kalinchuk, Olympic gymnast
 12 December – Vasily Borisov, Olympic shooting champion (died 2003)
 23 December – Sofya Kondakova, speed skater
 27 December – Yevheniia Kucherenko, pedagogue
 date unknown – Ilya Timofeyevich Osipov, Red Army soldier and Hero of the Soviet Union

See also 
 1922 in fine arts of the Soviet Union
 List of Soviet films of 1922

References 

 
1920s in the Soviet Union
Years in the Soviet Union
Soviet Union
Soviet Union
Soviet Union